Martin Beattie Fisher (January 2, 1881 – December 17, 1941) was a Canadian politician.  He was a Member of the provincial legislature in Quebec.

Background

He was born in Hemmingford, Montérégie on January 2, 1881.

Member of the legislature

He successfully ran as a Conservative candidate and won a by-election in 1930 in the district of Huntingdon.  Fisher was re-elected in 1931, 1935 and was re-elected as a Union Nationale candidate in 1936.

Cabinet Member

He was appointed to the Cabinet in 1936 and served as Treasurer.

Legislative Councillor

Not long before the 1939 election, Fisher was appointed to the Legislative Council of Quebec by Premier of Quebec Maurice Duplessis and served in that function until his death.  He represented the division of Inkerman.

Death

He died on December 17, 1941.

Footnotes

1881 births
1941 deaths
Union Nationale (Quebec) MLCs
Conservative Party of Quebec MNAs
Union Nationale (Quebec) MNAs
People from Montérégie
Anglophone Quebec people